The Waihopai River — the more southerly of two New Zealand rivers of that name — runs through the South Island's Southland Region. A narrow stream for much of its  length, it has its source in several streams arising in low hill country between Edendale and Dacre, all of which run generally west-southwest, passing through or close to the township of Woodlands. The Waihopai runs west from this point, passing through the northern suburbs of Invercargill City and then turns south, running between Invercargill's built-up area and Invercargill Airport, before flowing into the northern end of the New River Estuary at Stead Street Bridge.

The river lends its name to the Maori name for Invercargill, Waihōpai.

Rivers of Southland, New Zealand
Rivers of New Zealand